The Indiana Army Ammunition Plant was an Army manufacturing plant built in 1941 between Charlestown and Jeffersonville, Indiana.  It consisted of three areas within two separate but attached manufacturing plants:
 Indiana Ordnance Works Plant 1 (IOW#1): (3,564.71 acres) made smokeless powder
 Indiana Ordnance Works Plant 2 (IOW#2): (2,757.49 acres) made rocket propellant
 Hoosier Ordnance Plant (HOP): (4,326.8 acres) manufactured (and loaded) propellant charge bags

Creation
In 1940 it was announced that the world's largest smokeless powder plant would be built near Charlestown, as the land was close to the Ohio River, giving it the water necessary for making smokeless powder, and the fact that the land was cheap because parts of it were unsuitable for farming, and because few individuals lived on it.  The plant was built and operated as a Government-Owned, Contractor-Operated (GOCO) facility.

Actual building of IOW Plant 1, a six line plant with support facilities, started on September 4, 1940, although officially it started on August 28, and was completed on May 31, 1942. The first line was put into production in April 1941. The IOW facilities were built and operated initially by E.I. DuPont de Nemours and Co.  During World War II the production of this plant exceeded the total World War I production of all other smokeless powder producing plants in the US. During the Korean War, DuPont cleaned away the excess powder and restarted production in 1950. The plant ran a maximum capacity with 3,000 employees until 1954.

IOW Plant 2, designed as a three line facility for the production of double base rocket propellant, was started in November 1944 but stopped, without completion, on V-J Day. All areas except the powder storage facilities were placed in caretaker status. The remaining  were utilized as woodland, crop land, and the site of a new automated black powder manufacturing facility.

The Hoosier Ordnance Plant was built by W-H-M-S Construction company (Winston Brothers, Haglin, Missouri Valley and Solitt) and operated by Goodyear Engineering Corporation (GEC).  Production started in September 1941 and continued until V-J Day in 1945. Layaway was completed in February 1946. Limited production resumed in 1950 until a rehabilitation of the facility was completed in 1952.  Goodyear took complete control over production in July 1952 under a Cost Plus Fixed Fee contract and continued until layaway of the facility in September 1957. Employment at the HOP during this period reached a high of 8,067 in August 1953, during the Korean War.

In May, 1941, the three plants employed 27,520 people, which helped the area recover from the Great Depression.

Post-war Era
The three plants were combined as the Indiana Arsenal under War Department Circular No. 329 on November 30, 1945, and renamed the Indiana Army Ammunition Plant in August 1963 by Department of the Army General Order No. 35.

In March 1959, Goodyear took over maintenance of all plants, and was succeeded by Liberty Powder Defense Corporation in November 1959. Olin Mathieson Chemical Corporation dissolved Liberty Powder (an operating unit) and assumed control effective October 1, 1962 and continued operations until April 1972, when it was succeeded by ICI Americas.

In June 1960,  of Plant 1 was turned over to Clark County, which uses it as the site of the 4-H Center.

Today

The ammunition manufacturing facility, placed into modified caretaker status in 1992, was operated by ICI Americas as Facility I (an industrial park), and approved for transfer to the INAAP Reuse Authority (a Local Reuse Authority, or LRA) by congressional action. It is presently called the River Ridge Commerce Center. Title to  has transferred to the LRA (October 2007), with transfer of another , located in Plant 1, awaiting cleanup for transfer.  The other  was transferred to the State of Indiana and is operated by the Indiana Department of Natural Resources as Charlestown State Park.

E W Wells Group, an environmental company based in Dallas Texas, is performing a portion of the explosive residue threat removal and building demolitions operations. The final stages of plant cleanup were scheduled for completion by 31 December 2014.

See also
Jeffersonville Quartermaster Depot
Naval Ordnance Station Louisville

References

External links
Charlestown, IN and the Indiana Army Ammunition Plant: The Making of A War-Industry Boom-Town by Rob Vest
Indiana Army Ammunition Plant at Abandoned
Indiana Army Ammunition Plant by Zach Fein

River Ridge Commerce Center
Charlestown Powder Plant
"World War II Comes to Indiana: The Indiana Army Ammunition Plant, Part I," Indiana Historical Bureau
"World War II Comes to Indiana: The Indiana Army Ammunition Plant, Part II," Indiana Historical Bureau

Charlestown, Indiana
United States Army arsenals
Indiana in World War II
Historic American Engineering Record in Indiana
Military installations in Indiana
United States Army arsenals during World War II
Buildings and structures in Clark County, Indiana
1941 establishments in Indiana